The auditions for Season 3 started in March 2008, as in auditions for the previous seasons. There was a form to fill in the Latin American Idol official site to try for auditions for 2008.

Auditions dates and cities for Season 3 were:

March 29, 2008 - Buenos Aires, Argentina
April 11, 2008 - Bogotá, Colombia
April 19, 2008 - Caracas, Venezuela
April 26, 2008 - Mexico City, México
May 3, 2008 - Panama City, Panama

Season 3 premiered on Thursday, June 19, 2008 at 9 pm in Sony Entertainment Television, with the auditions from Mexico. As American Idol and Canadian Idol, it also start using the new intro sequence. Episodes from Venezuela's and Argentina's auditions were broadcast on June 25 and June 26 respectively. Episodes from Colombia's and Panamá's auditions were broadcast on July 2 and July 3 respectively. Theatre Stage episodes were aired on July 9 and July 10, with the Top 30 being announced at the end of July 10 episode. Semifinals Episodes started on July 16. Finals Episodes started on August 13.

Top 12 Finalists

Weekly Themes
Week 1 (August 13) - Songs from the 80s
Week 2 (August 20) - Songs by Enrique Iglesias
Week 3 (August 27) - Tropical Songs
Week 4 (September 3) - Rock with Pop influences
Week 5 (September 10) - Disco Songs
Week 6 (September 17) - Spanish Versions of American Songs
Week 7 (September 24) - Spanish Songs
Week 8 (October 1) - Remakes
Week 9 (October 8) - Songs Written for the Show

Performers on results shows
Week 1 (August 14) - Alejandra Guzmán
Week 2 (August 21) - Enrique Iglesias
Week 3 (August 28) - Cabas
Week 4 (September 4) - Aleks Syntek
Week 5 (September 11) - Kudai
Week 6 (September 18) - Fonseca
Week 7 (September 25) - Axel
Week 8 (October 2) -  Luis Fonsi
Week 9 (October 9) - David Bisbal, Belanova, Beto Cuevas, and Carlos Peña.

Elimination chart

As of the first three concerts, the "Bottom" contestants were not directly mentioned. Instead, this chart shows the contestants who weren't called "Saved" at the moment of declaring the eliminated contestant(s) on each concert. The contestants that don't appear as "Bottom" on a specific date were announced as "Safe" before another contestant(s) was/were announced "Eliminated".*
On the seventh concert results show, the producers decided to send the four remaining finalists to their respective countries without making the ordinary elimination. Host Monchi Balestra announced that the votes of the seventh and eighth concerts would be merged, so the bottom two contestants would be eliminated on October 2 and the other two would pass to the final week.

Workshops
First Workshop

 Sinahi Mendez - "Volveré" (Jesse & Joy)
 Ariana Dao Bolivar - "El Tiempo Que Duró Nuestro Amor" (Cristian Castro)  (Wildcard)
 Rodrigo Tapia - "Dejame Ser Yo" (Luis Fonsi)
 Kelly Ojeda - "Un Día Sin Ti" (Roxette)
 José Manuel Espinoza - "Vuelve" (Reik)  (Finalist)
 Margarita Henriquez - "El Mundo Que Soñé" (Laura Pausini)  (Finalist)
 Licetty Alfaro - "No Hay Forma De Pedir Perdón" (Pedro Aznar)  (Wildcard)
 Jesús Pardo - "Que Lástima" (Alejandro Fernández)  (Finalist)
 Monserrath Franco - "Perdición" (La Quinta Estación)  (Wildcard)
 Ricardo Rosas - "No Importa La Distancia" (Ricky Martin)

Second Workshop
 Osvaldo Conde - "Que no me Pierda" (Diego Torres)
 Eliana Berreta - "Lo Que Son Las Cosas" (Ednita Nazario)  (Wildcard)
 Iván Torcartés - "Antes" (Obie Bermúdez)
 Anne Lorain Lanier - "Amor A Medias" (Ha-Ash)  (Finalist)
 Juan David Becerra - "Regresa A Mi" (Yuridia)
 Andrea Ponce - "Me Entrego A Ti" (Ha-Ash)
 Karina Catalán - "¿Quién Eres Tú?" (Yuri)  (Wildcard)
 Manuel Arauz - "Si Tu Supieras" (Alejandro Fernández)  (Finalist)
 Sandra Muente - "Si Ya Se Acabó" (Jennifer Lopez)  (Finalist)
 Raquel Bustamante - "Me Va A Extrañar" (Ricardo Montaner)  (Wildcard)

Third Workshop
 Vanesa Leiro - "Atrévete" (Chenoa)
 María José Castillo - "Sin Ti" (Mariah Carey)  (Finalist)
 Rodrigo Arizpe - "Sueña" (Luis Miguel)
 Francisca Silva - "La Paz De Tus Ojos" (La Oreja De Van Gogh)  (Wildcard)
 Nicole Pillman - "Escucha A Tu Corazón" (Laura Pausini)  (Finalist)
 Daniela Cevallos - "Él Me Mintió" (Amanda Miguel)
 Manuel Salas - "Dime Si Él" (Ricardo Arjona)  (Finalist)
 Yina Gallego - "Te Busco" (Celia Cruz)  (Wildcard)
 Carlos Quezada - "El Amor Que Soñé" (Mariah Carey)
 Pako Madrid - "Canta Corazón" (Alejandro Fernández)  (Wildcard)

Wildcard Workshop
 Raquel Bustamante - "Tú" (Shakira)  (Finalist)
 Monserrath Franco - "El Sol No Regresa" (La Quinta Estación)
 Ariana Dao Bolivar - "Reloj" (Luis Miguel)
 Francisca Silva - "Ahora Quien" (Marc Anthony)  (Finalist)
 Eliana Berreta - "Sola Otra Vez" (Celine Dion)
 Licetty Alfaro - "Miénteme" (Bárbara Muñoz)
 Karina Catalán - "Pienso En Ti" (Adrianna Foster)
 Yina Gallego - "Malo" (Bebe)
 Pako Madrid - "El Alma En Pie" (Chenoa & David Bisbal)  (Finalist)

Top 95 (Golden Tickets)
All the winners of Golden Tickets went to the Theatre Stage on Buenos Aires, Argentina. Episodes of this stage were broadcast on July 9 and July 10. On July 10 with the final cuts made, the group of seminalists for this season was revealed.

Mexico
The contestants left out of the semi finals from México's auditions were:Grethel Jiménez Zavaleta, 19, Tuxtla Gutierrez, MéxicoYareli Lizette Ortega Herrera, 22, México D.F., MéxicoIldelfonso Acuña Ruiz, 26, Hermosillo, MéxicoAri Benedicto Castro, 22, Puebla, MéxicoMiriam Jackeline Solis Sierra, 25, Guadalajara, MéxicoPaulina Cerda Manzo, 15, San Luis Potosí, MéxicoPatricia Castillo Muñoz, 25, Aguascalientes, MéxicoVíctor Manuel Gonzalez Velásquez, 26, Mexicali, MéxicoClaudia Lizbeth Fuentes Nevarez, 25, Chihuahua, MéxicoRodolfo Alejandro Escalera, 20, Torreón, MéxicoKarina Guadalupe Esparza Rodriguez, 17, Culiacán, MéxicoMartín Vaca Vea, 23, Morelia, México - (Former La Academia Series 3 contestant)Jairo Wilmont, 25, (Dominican Republic)Amid Guadalupe Origen, 24, Guadalajara, México

Venezuela
The contestants left out of the semi finals from Venezuela's auditions were: Maria Elena Rodríguez López, 16, Miranda, VenezuelaOscar León Oropeza, 18, Caracas, VenezuelaJuliana Douaihy Viso, 21, Valencia, VenezuelaDervis Pérez Rojas, 20, Carora, VenezuelaGabriela Puche Parra, 22, Valencia, VenezuelaDaniela Rizquez Ron, 21, Caracas VenezuelaJuan Alejandro Medici Díaz, 26, Falcón, VenezuelaAriana Velasco Salas, 19, Caracas, VenezuelaRichard Alejandro Núñez Rojas, 26, Caracas, VenezuelaPaola Andrea Murillo Barrios, 20, Barquisimeto, VenezuelaSherezade Valentiner Cuesta, 18, Miranda, VenezuelaMarianella Rojas Mata, 18, Caracas, VenezuelaAtef Habib Pollino, 16, Puerto Ordaz, VenezuelaRossana Cavallina León, 20, Guarico, VenezuelaJosué Eduardo García González, 25, Caracas, VenezuelaEugenio Keller Puente, 18, Caracas, VenezuelaMaría Elena Planchart Mendoza, 26, Caracas, VenezuelaRomina Gabriela Luis Rodriguez, 21, Maracay, Venezuela

Argentina
The contestants left out of the semi finals from Argentina's auditions were: Rodrigo Tapia González, 21, La Calera, Chile - (Former Rojo Fama Contrafama contestant)Bárbara Sodor, 18, Buenos Aires, ArgentinaJuan Pablo Schapira, 18, Buenos Aires, ArgentinaMarcela Von der Walde, 21, Buenos Aires, ArgentinaMarianella Giangreco, 20, Salta, ArgentinaSofía Macchi, 16, Buenos Aires, ArgentinaDaniela Sciancalepore, 17, Buenos Aires ArgentinaMariana Geraldine Ojeda Tulián, 16, Buenos Aires ArgentinaDaniela Valeska Cevallos Bravo, 19, Santiago, Chile - (Former Rojo Fama Contrafama contestant)Arnaldo Peralta, 20, Buenos Aires, ArgentinaPablo Cúndalo, 22, Buenos Aires, ArgentinaRodrigo Massa Moreira Da Silva, 22, São Paulo, BrazilGiovanna Salinas Córdova, 26, Lima, Peru

Colombia
The contestants left out of the semi finals from Colombia's auditions were:Xihomara Cáceres Ortiz, 21, Bucaramanga, ColombiaCarolina Granda Saona, 19, Quito, EcuadorYoser Ruiz Aguilera, 21, Bogotá, ColombiaLuis Fabián Peña Villarreal, 22, Barranquilla, ColombiaMelissa Mejía Flomín, 26, Bogotá, ColombiaKavir Sánchez Amorocho, 25, Bogotá, ColombiaYesid Eduardo Uribe Ordóñez, 21, Bucaramanga, ColombiaPaul Tamayo Caviedes, 26, Bogotá, ColombiaLuis Gabriel Cano Valencia, 26, Medellín, ColombiaMónica Castillo Cabeza, 26, ColombiaJosé Manrique Mazuera, 18, Valle del Cauca, ColombiaEstefanía Varela Madrid, 16, Medellín, ColombiaSebastián Larrañaga Arboleda, 26, Bogotá, ColombiaJaime Rojas Buitrago, 22, Valle del Cauca, ColombiaSandra Saa Morales, 22, Bogotá, ColombiaJuan Manuel Medina Valencia, 24, Bogotá, ColombiaCarlos Mario Kandia García, 17, Bogotá, Colombia

Panamá
The contestants left out of the semi finals from Panamá's auditions were:José Andaluz Quezada, 22, El Salvador, San SalvadorShearley Beatriz Hernández Ranero, 23, GuatemalaRobinson Pimentel Penso, 22, Caracas, VenezuelaBrenda Lau Poon, 24, Betania, Panamá (Former VIVE LA MUSICA contestant)Ibeth Samaniego Vergara''', 19, Panamá

External links
 Official website

Latin American Idol
2008 television seasons
2008 in Latin music